Indonautilus is an involute nautilid from the Middle and Upper Triassic. (Anisian-Norian), with a small or occluded umbilicus and subrectangular whorl section belonging to the Liroceratidae (Clydonaulilaceae). Flanks are slightly bowed, converging on a flattened venter. Ventro-lateral shoulders are narrowly rounded or angular. Umbilical shoulder are broadly rounded. The siphuncle is subdorsal.

Indonautilus has been found in Egypt, Israel, the Himalayas, and East Indies.

References

 Bernhard Kummel, 1964. Nautiloidea -Nautilida;   Treatise on Invertebrate Paleontology, Part K. Geological Society of America and University of Kansas Press.  
 Indonautilus in the Paleobiology database 4/25/14

Prehistoric nautiloid genera
Anisian genus first appearances
Ladinian genera
Carnian genera
Norian genus extinctions